The Town Farms Inn is a historic poor farm on Silver Street at River Road in Middletown, Connecticut.  It was listed on the National Register of Historic Places in 1979.  The poor farm provided employment and food for indigent people.  (A similar town farm was operated in Hartford, on land now part of the Sigourney Square District.)

There are two principal buildings. The older structure dates back to the late 1830s and is a -story, Federal style house built of brick. The exact date of construction is not known, but the date 1839 is carved into a flagstone in the front walk, and the style of construction is consistent with architecture in the late 1830s. The second building was built in 1891. Between the two buildings, there were 14 rooms on the first floor, 29 rooms on the second, and three on the third floor. The back yard contains a long brick outbuilding, which is one story high and has a pitched roof.

The inn was originally built as a farmhouse by Thomas Griswold Mather, who married his first cousin Jane Ann Mather in 1834. His wife died in 1853, at which point he sold the farm and the buildings to the town of Middletown. The town operated it as a poor farm until 1946. By that time, town farms had been superseded by other social agencies. The town sold the property, and the new owners established a restaurant.

See also
National Register of Historic Places listings in Middletown, Connecticut

References

Commercial buildings on the National Register of Historic Places in Connecticut
Federal architecture in Connecticut
Commercial buildings completed in 1839
Buildings and structures in Middletown, Connecticut
National Register of Historic Places in Middlesex County, Connecticut